The CASCAR Super Series was Canada's premier stock car touring division. It was sanctioned by CASCAR. The series ended after the 2006 season after NASCAR purchased CASCAR, and NASCAR used it as the basis for the NASCAR Pinty's Series.

General Tire served as the series' title sponsor from 1988 to 1990, followed by Budweiser from 1993 to 1993. Castrol held the naming rights from 1994 to the final season in 2006.

A western counterpart called the CASCAR West Super Series began racing in 1992, replacing CASCAR's Hobby Stock division. In addition to being its own championship, the West Super Series conducted combination races with the national series.

Past champions

 * – All events held at Delaware Speedway

Tracks

References

External links
 Canadian Racing Online web site

Stock car racing series
Auto racing series in Canada
Motorsport in Canada
1986 establishments in Canada
2006 disestablishments in Canada